Achanalt railway station is a geographically remote railway station on the Kyle of Lochalsh Line, serving the village of Achanalt in the north of Scotland. ScotRail, who manage the station, operate all services.

History 

The station was opened by the Dingwall and Skye Railway, but operated from the outset by the Highland Railway. Taken into the London, Midland and Scottish Railway during the Grouping of 1923, the line then passed on to the Scottish Region of British Railways on nationalisation in 1948.

When Sectorisation was introduced by British Rail, the station became part of ScotRail until the Privatisation of British Rail.

Facilities 
Facilities here, as with many other stations down the line, are minimal, comprising just a shelter, some bike racks and a small car park. The station is step-free to the car park. As there are no facilities to purchase tickets, passengers must buy one in advance, or from the guard on the train.

Passenger volume 

The statistics cover twelve month periods that start in April.

Service 
Four trains each way call (on request) on weekdays/Saturdays, and one each way all year on Sundays, plus a second from May to late September only.

References

Bibliography

External links

 Station on navigable O.S. map
 RailScot: Dingwall and Skye Railway

Railway stations in Highland (council area)
Former Highland Railway stations
Railway stations in Great Britain opened in 1870
Railway stations served by ScotRail
Railway request stops in Great Britain
Low usage railway stations in the United Kingdom